H.H. Chesterman briefly served as Secretary of State of Minnesota.

Chesterman, who had served as Assistant Secretary of State under Mike Holm, was appointed to the position in July 1952 by Gov. Elmer Anderson after Holm's death. Chesterman was replaced by Anderson in September of that year; Anderson appointed Virginia Paul Holm, Mike Holm's widow, after public sentiment grew that she should succeed him.

References

External links
Brief biography of H.H. Chesterman

Secretaries of State of Minnesota
Year of birth missing
Year of death missing